Thailand participated in and hosted the 2007 Southeast Asian Games which were primarily held in the city of Nakhon Ratchasima from 6 December 2007 to 16 December 2007.

Participation details

References

2007 in Thai sport
Nations at the 2007 Southeast Asian Games
2007